Fahri Tatan (born 30 May 1983, in Rize) is a Turkish former professional footballer.

Club career
He was transferred from Beşiktaş in July 2008. He was loaned out to his old club Çaykur Rizespor for the 2007–2008 season. He played also for Pazarspor and Fenerbahçe.

Eskişehirspor
On 18 January 2010, Fahri joined Süper Lig club Eskişehirspor on a 1,5 year deal.

Adanaspor
On August 2010, Fahri signed a new deal with Adanaspor.

International career
Fahri has made eight appearances for the senior Turkish national football team. He made his debut entering as a second-half substitute in a friendly against Azerbaijan on 12 April 2006.

Honours

Club
Beşiktaş
Turkish Cup: 2006–07
Turkish Super Cup: 2006

References

External links
  
 
 

1983 births
Living people
Turkish footballers
Fenerbahçe S.K. footballers
Beşiktaş J.K. footballers
Çaykur Rizespor footballers
Konyaspor footballers
Denizlispor footballers
Eskişehirspor footballers
Adanaspor footballers
Kartalspor footballers
Turkey international footballers
Turkey B international footballers
Süper Lig players
Turkey under-21 international footballers
Turkey youth international footballers
Association football midfielders
Sportspeople from Rize